The Sacred Military Constantinian Order of Saint George (SMOCG), also historically referred to as the Imperial Constantinian Order of Saint George and the Order of the Constantinian Angelic Knights of Saint George, is a dynastic order of knighthood of the House of Bourbon-Two Sicilies. Currently, the grand magistry of the order is disputed among the two claimants to the headship of the former reigning House of Bourbon-Two Sicilies as heirs of the House of Farnese, namely  Prince Pedro and Prince Carlo. The order was one of the rare orders confirmed as a religious-military order in a 1718 papal bull owing to a notable success in liberating Christians in the Peloponnese. Together with the Sovereign Military Order of Malta and the Order of Saints Maurice and Lazarus (confirmed by papal bull in 1572) it is one of the three international Catholic Orders that still has this status today. Although it is not an order of chivalry under patronage of the Holy See, membership is restricted to practising Catholics.

Though the order is alleged to have been founded in its original form by Constantine the Great in Antiquity and then restored under later Byzantine emperors, the actual origin of the order can be traced to the 16th century, when it was founded by an Albanian family by the name Angelo Flavio Comneno. Though this family, extinct in 1698, claimed to be connected to the Byzantine Komnenos and Angelos dynasties, such a familial connection cannot be proven. The order being connected to the Byzantine Empire is fantasy as chivalric orders were completely unknown in the Byzantine world, so much of the alleged history of the order was invented much later. Outside the generally recognized line of grand masters from its origin in the 16th century to the present day, there have been many people claiming to be grand masters who have been forgers and title-seekers hoping to gain support for invented lines of descent from ancient and medieval nobility.

The Italian State 
The Italian Republic recognises the order as an Order of Chivalry under Law n° 178 of 1951 authorises the Italian citizens awarded with the Constantinian decoration to show them as authoritatively recognised also by the Italian State Council in its decision number 1869/81. Therefore those citizens lawfully awarded with Constantinian decorations can ask to use them on the territory of the Italian Republic by Presidential Decree or Decree of the Ministry of Foreign Affairs. By Decree of the President of the Republic, in 1973 the National Italian Association of the Knights of the Sacred Military Constantinian Order of St. George. The order is on the Orders, decorations, and medals of Italy list.

History

Origins 
The legendary origins of the Sacred Military Constantinian Order of Saint George trace its foundation to an apocryphal order founded by Constantine the Great. Although it has sometimes been held that the order would have been restored/created by the Byzantine emperor Isaac II Angelos, any claimed connection between chivalric orders and the Eastern Roman Empire are pure fantasy, as chivalric orders in the modern Western sense were completely unknown in the Byzantine world. At best, any connection to some ancient group would be excessively indirect and abstracted.

The order was actually founded by Albanian nobles of the Angelo Flavio Comneno family (claiming connection to the Byzantine houses of Angelos and Komnenos) in the 16th century, attested in association with a man by the name Andrea Angelo Flavio Comneno, and his brother Paolo Angelo Flavio Comneno, in 1545. In 1545, the brothers Andrea and Paolo were officially acknowledged as descendants of the Angeloi emperors (a claim seen as doubtful today) by Pope Paul III. The brothers were also guaranteed the right to inherit territory in the former Byzantine Empire, should such territory be recovered from the Ottomans. Their family remained grand masters of the order until 1698 when Giovanni Andrea Angelo Flavio Comneno Lascaris Paleologo, who also claimed the titles of "Prince of Macedonia", "Duke of Thessaly" and "Count of Drivasto, Durazzo etc." upon his death assigned the order not to any living relatives but to Francesco Farnese, the duke of Parma.

Outside the generally recognized line of grand masters from its origin in the 17th century to the present day, there have been many people claiming to be grand masters who have been forgers and title-seekers hoping to gain support for invented lines of descent from ancient and medieval nobility.

Farnese family, male primogeniture
Its incorporation as a religious order of the Catholic Church hereditary in the House of Farnese and its heirs, the Bourbons, dates from the transfer to Francesco Farnese on 11 January 1698, an act confirmed in an imperial diploma, "Agnoscimus et notum facimus", of the emperor, Leopold I, dated 5 August 1699, and the apostolic brief, "Sincerae Fidei", issued by Pope Innocent XII on 24 October 1699.  These confirmed the succession of the grand magistry to the Farnese family and its heirs as an ecclesiastical office (therefore limited to males) and, crucially, did not tie it to tenure of sovereignty of the Duchy of Parma. Among the first major acts of the Farnese grand magistry were revised, amended and expanded statutes, issued on 25 May 1705 and confirmed in a papal brief dated 12 July 1706; both these confirmed the requirement that the grand magistry should pass by male primogeniture. Following the order's contribution to Prince Eugene of Savoy's campaign to drive the Turks from the Balkans between 1716 and 1718, Pope Clement XI, a former cardinal protector of the order, confirmed the order as a religious order of the Roman Catholic Church in the bull, "Militantis Ecclesiae", of 27 May 1718.

Claim by the House of Two Sicilies

With the death of the last male of the House of Farnese on 30 January 1731, the grand magistry was claimed by Charles, eldest son of Elisabeth Farnese and King Philip V of Spain; Charles also inherited the duchies of Parma and Piacenza from the Farnese. After becoming king of Naples and Sicily in 1734, Charles was forced to surrender Parma to Austria in 1736, but he retained the Constantinian grand magistry. On 16 October 1759, Charles abdicated the grand magistry (ten days after abdicating the “Italian Sovereignties”) to his second surviving son, King Ferdinand IV and III of Naples and Sicily (from 1815 Ferdinand I of the Two Sicilies). The administration of the order was transferred from Parma to Naples in 1768.

Despite the loss of its original basis of papal legitimacy, the Order continued to function under Ferdinand I and his successor heads of the House of Bourbon-Two Sicilies. It has continued to do so after the fall of the Kingdom of Two Sicilies; the view of the Bourbon-Sicily family is that the grand magistry was never united with the Sicilian crown, but remained independent. Ferdinand's words, in a decree of 8 March 1796, were: "In his (the king's) royal person there exists together two very distinct qualities, the one of monarch of the Two Sicilies, and the other of grand master of the illustrious, royal and military Constantinian Order, which though united gloriously in the same person form nonetheless at the same time two separate independent lordships".

The succession of Ferdinand I as grand master was resented by some of the Parmesan nobility but when in 1748, Charles III's younger brother Philip succeeded as duke of Parma, he explicitly recognised his brother Charles and later his nephew Ferdinand as grand master in a series of decrees and official acts. Philip's son Ferdinand, after becoming duke of Parma, sent an emissary to the Spanish court to try to persuade the king of Spain to intervene with the king of Naples and Sicily and persuade the latter to give up the grand mastership, but without success.

Separate Parmesan Order from 1817

The Parmesan Constantinian Order was a new foundation, instituted by Marie Louise, Duchess of Parma, in 1817 and following her death the duke of Lucca, heir to the Bourbon-Parma succession, became duke of Parma under the terms of the Congress of Vienna and assumed the grand mastership which is today claimed by Prince Carlos, Duke of Parma. See the historical note authored by Paolo Conforte, a senior officer of the Parma dynastic order, who maintains that the Parma Order, despite its late foundation, is the successor of the original order; this view was explicitly rejected by the Holy See in 1860 and in 1913 the Holy See did not respond to a request from the Parma ducal family to accord their order similar privileges to those granted to the order of which Prince Alfonso, Count of Caserta was grand master.

The Order under the House of Two Sicilies

In 1910, Pope Pius X appointed the first of three successive cardinal protectors and, in 1913, approved a series of privileges for the chaplains of the order. In 1915, Pope Benedict XV dedicated the Constantinian chapel in the basilica of Santa Croce al Flaminio, which had been built with donations from the knights, who included Monsignor Eugenio Pacelli, later Pope Pius XII. In 1916, the pope restored the church of Saint Anthony Abbot to the Order - this church had originally been given to the Constantinian order along with the properties of the religious order of that name in 1777, but had been put under the direction of the archdiocese of Naples in 1861.

In 1919, new statutes received papal approval and Cardinal Ranuzzi de' Bianchi was appointed cardinal protector, the last to hold this post. Following the intervention of the grand magistry of the Order of Saints Maurice and Lazarus in 1924, whose grand master, the king of Italy, objected to the awarding of the order to leading Italian noblemen, the Holy See felt the close relationship with Prince Alfonso, Count of Caserta might prove an obstacle to settling the Roman question. It was, therefore, decided not to reappoint a successor to Cardinal Ranuzzi de' Bianchi at his death in 1927.

Disputed succession, further schism of the Order

The succession to the grand magistry of this order has been disputed among as many as three branches of Bourbons since 1960. The dispute is rooted in different interpretations of the so-called "Act of Cannes" of 14 December 1900 in which the count of Caserta's second son, Prince Carlo (grandfather of Infante Carlos, Duke of Calabria), promised that he would renounce his succession to the crown of the Two Sicilies in execution of the "Pragmatic Decree" of 1759. This decree required that if the king of Spain, or his immediate heir, should inherit the Two Sicilies crown, he would renounce the latter to the next in line. Whether the "Pragmatic Decree" applied to Prince Carlo's situation in 1900, and whether the grand magistry of the order was included in such a renunciation, are both issues in dispute, yet within the world of academia, the latter has been, almost without exception, ruled in favour of the Hispano-Neapolitan branch. The Act of Cannes literally states:

Supporters of the late Infante Carlos, Duke of Calabria and his only son and heir, Prince Pedro, Duke of Calabria assert that Prince Carlo's renunciation was conditional on his actually inheriting both the Spanish and Two Sicilies crowns and/or that, even in that circumstances, such a renunciation did not include the position of grand master of the Constantinian order, which they regard as separate from the crown. Indeed, the Act of Cannes never mentioned the order at all, although most authors argue that even if it had, its grand magistry is by nature a trustee Farnesian dynastic legacy that is not linked in any shape or form to the throne of the Two Sicilies. The official Spanish branch website, headed by Prince Pedro, asserts that the renunciation was conditioned on facts that never arose, and that the order and the crown are governed by separate rules. Further, supporters of Infante Carlos argue that the "Act of Cannes" was legally defective and thus void. The Infante Don Carlos died on the 5 October 2015 and was succeeded by his only son, Prince Pedro, Duke of Calabria.

Supporters of Prince Carlo, Duke of Castro reject all three positions advanced by Infante Carlos' supporters, and claim that the rival claimant's ancestor validly renounced both the crown of the Two Sicilies and the grand magistry.

Each branch appoints a Roman Catholic cardinal as grand prior.  On 16 October 2012, the Vatican Secretary of State renewed its position that the Holy See does not recognise any order except the seven Papal Orders listed on their statement. The Sacred Military Constantinian Order of Saint George was not one of those orders. Nonetheless, the Hispano-Neapolitan Order's use of a chapel in Barcelona Cathedral has twice been confirmed by the Apostolic Penitentiary  and the Hispanio-Neapolitan Order's Masses have been celebrated by the Order's Grand Prior Cardinal Gerhard Ludwig Müller in the Major Basilica of Saint Mary Major, Rome, as well as in Naples, Palermo, London, and Philadelphia, while other senior Roman Curia cardinals  have also celebrated at investitures and other religious ceremonies of the Order.

Version led by Prince Pedro, Duke of Calabria (Hispano-Neapolitan branch)
Spaniards and Italians who have been granted the Constantinian Order by Infante Carlos, Duke of Calabria and his heir Prince Pedro have applied for, and received, authorisation to wear the decorations of the order.

In a decree of the Spanish Ministry of Foreign Affairs by the Introductor de Embajadores, 28 November 2014, the Ministry stated that along with the Sovereign Military Order of Malta, the Equestrian Order of the Holy Sepulchre and the Royal Order of Saint Januarius (of which Prince Pedro, Duke of Calabria, is also Grand Master) "... la Sagrada y Militar Orden Constantiniana de San Jorge fueron tuteladas por la Corona de Espana o se hallan estrechamente vinculadas a su Historia, tal y como preve en este sentido el Ministerio de Defensa en su Instruccion General 06/12 sobre autorización de uso de recompensas civiles y militares." ("...the Sacred Military Constantinian Order of Saint George, came under the protection of or were linked to the Crown and history of Spain, as set forth by the Ministry of Defence in its General Instruction 06/12, on permission to wear civil and military awards"). The status of the Constantinian Order was again defined in a statement by the Introductor de Embajadores, dated 2 June 2017 and issued in Spanish, French and English - the latter read: "...Hereby Certifies That the Sacred Military Constantinian Order of Saint George and the Royal Order of Saint Januarius are officially recognized by Spain as Orders historically tied to the Crown of Spain, pursuant to the Ministry's Circular Order 4/2014 of 28 November. The use of the insignias of these two Orders is subject to the appropriate authorization, issued by the Ministry of Foreign Affairs, as stipulated by the Royal Decree of 5 June 1916, signed by the Introducer of Ambassadors, Ambassador-Secretary of the Order of Isabella the Catholic and the Order of Civil Merit." The Constantinian Order awarded by Prince Pedro is explicitly authorised to be worn by the governments of Italy and Mexico and citizens of the Netherlands have also been authorised to wear it. The United States Department of the Army has included the Order among those for which authorisation may be given to wear the decorations on the official list of such awards, under Spain.

Version led by Prince Carlo, Duke of Castro (Franco-Neapolitan branch)

In the 1990s, under the authority of Prince Carlo, Duke of Castro, the organization and activities of his version of the order were "revived" as the so-called "Delegation for Great Britain and Ireland of the Sacred Military Constantinian Order of Saint George". This version of the Order was formerly led by a British Catholic public relations advisor as its "magistral delegate", and has awarded him other honours. In August 2016, the Vice-Grand Chancellor of the Hispano-Neapolitan branch, Guy Stair Sainty stated that the order headed by Prince Pedro had no connection with this PR advisor, nor with his business activities, nor with the order of which he is described as “delegate”.

Italian citizens who have received the Constantinian Order from Prince Carlo, Duke of Castro may apply to the Italian ministry of foreign affairs for authorisation to wear the insignia.

In 2011, the version of the Constantinian Order headed by the Duke of Castro, became one of the 3,536 NGO's. In 2011-12 some 600 organizations applied for consultative status. On average between 100 and 150 applications are recommended by the Committee in each of its two sessions per year non-governmental organizations to hold consultative status at the Economic and Social Council at the United Nations. The United Nations recognises the organisation as qualifying for this status without acknowledging its historical claims or any particular character as an Order of knighthood.

In 2016, the branch of the Order led by the Duke of Castro was involved in controversy over the election of Patricia Scotland as Commonwealth Secretary-General. It was alleged that Scotland used the Order's awards to influence votes in her favour through reciprocal exchanges of honours. Investigations resulted in a knighthood granted to the Duke of Castro by the Governor General of Antigua being revoked.

Attempted reconciliation

On 24 January 2014, the day before the Blessed Beatification of the Venerable Servant of God Princess Maria Cristina of Savoy (later Queen Maria Cristina, Queen Consort of the Two Sicilies), the two disputed heads of the house: Prince Pedro, Duke of Noto (on behalf of his father Prince Carlos, Duke of Calabria) and Prince Carlo, Duke of Castro signed an "Act of Reconciliation" at Naples' Excelsior Hotel.

This act appeared to have ended the longstanding differences over the titles used by the two branches of the House of the Two Sicilies. The signing of the act of reconciliation was done in the presence of the Duchesses of Noto and Castro, the Duke of Noto's mother, the Duchess of Calabria, the Duke of Noto's sisters, Maria and Inés, and their husbands, Archduke Simeon and Michele Carrelli Palombi, their aunt, Princess Teresa, Marchioness of Laserna, the Duke of Castro's sister, Princess Napoleon, Prince Casimiro of Bourbon-Two Sicilies and his wife Princess Margherita, and the Duke of Braganza. Owing to his state of health, the Infante Don Carlos, Duke of Calabria was unable to attend the ceremony.

The Act stated that the two branches will recognize each other's titles for the present holders and their successors; the titles of the senior, Spanish line, being Duke of Calabria, Duke of Noto and Duke of Capua, and of the junior line, being Duke of Castro and Duchess of Palermo and Duchess of Capri which were accorded to the Duke and Duchess of Castro's two daughters. The final intention was to work towards a future where the two branches might co-operate together (although the revival of the Order of Francis I has never been accepted by the senior, Spanish line.)

Renewed schism

In May 2016 Prince Carlo unilaterally renounced the agreement  and subsequently conferred the titles of Duchess of Calabria and Duchess of Noto on his daughters, declaring the former to be the heiress to the headship of the Royal House and the Constantinian Grand Mastership. This act has not been recognised by members of the branch descended from Prince Gabriel of Bourbon-Two Sicilies. The legality of this has been disputed by Prince Pedro on the grounds that the succession to the Two Sicilies crown was established in two international treaties (Vienna 1737 and Naples 1759) as well as the Pragmatic Decree of 1759 and the nineteenth century Two Sicilies constitutions and therefore could not be changed by a unilateral act, even by an undisputed head of the royal house. The succession to the Constantinian Grand Mastership was confirmed by an Imperial Bull and a Papal Brief, and by the Bull Militantis Ecclesiae, and required that the Grand Mastership, an ecclesiastical office in canon law, could only be held by males and must pass by primogeniture to the heirs of the House of Farnese; the purported change to the succession by Prince Carlo has not been approved by the Holy See.

Ranks of the Order

Grades
Special Class
(This category created by the Order headed by the Duke of Castro and is not considered part of the historical ranks of the Order.)
 Sovereign Knight Grand Cross with Collar
 Knight Grand Cross, Special Class

Justice
 Bailiff Knight Grand Cross of Justice with Collar
 Bailiff Knight Grand Cross of Justice
 Knight/Dame Grand Cross of Justice
 Knight/Dame Grand Officer of Justice (The rank of Grand Officer was recently introduced into the ranks of the Order headed by the Duke of Castro)
 Knight/Dame Commander of Justice, giuspatronato (The rank of Commander was created by the Order headed by the Duke of Castro)
 Knight/Dame Commander of Justice (The rank of Commander was created by the Order headed by the Duke of Castro)
 Knight/Dame of Justice

Grace or Jure Sanguinis
(The name Grace was changed to Jure Sanguinis by Infante Alfonso, Duke of Calabria, when Grand Master.)
 Knight/Dame Grand Cross of Grace, or Jure Sanguinis
 Knight/Dame Grand Officer of Grace (recently introduced into the ranks of the Order headed by the Duke of Castro)
 Knight/Dame Commander of Grace, giuspatronato (The rank of Commander was created by the Order headed by the Duke of Castro)
 Knight/Dame Commander of Grace (The rank of Commander was created by the Order headed by the Duke of Castro)
 Knight/Dame of Grace or Jure Sanguinis

Merit
 Knight/Dame Grand Cross of Merit
 Knight/Dame Grand Officer of Merit, Special Class (recently introduced into the ranks of the Order headed by the Duke of Castro)
 Knight/Dame Grand Officer of Merit (a rank created by the Order headed by the Duke of Castro)
 Knight/Dame Commander of Merit, giuspatronato (a rank created by the Order headed by the Duke of Castro)
 Knight/Dame Commander of Merit (a rank created by the Order headed by the Duke of Castro)
 Knight/Dame of Merit

Office

Knight/Dame of Office

Medal
 Gold, silver or bronze
 Special Class (a rank created by the Order headed by the Duke of Castro)
 1st Class
 2nd Class (a rank created by the Order headed by the Duke of Castro)

Recipients 

Bailiffs Grand Cross
 Vittorio Emanuele, Prince of Naples
 Emanuele Filiberto of Savoy, Prince of Venice
 Angelo Bagnasco
 William Wakefield Baum
 Robert Hugo, Duke of Parma
 Archduke Simeon von Habsburg
 Archduke Johannes of Austria
 Archduke Ludwig of Austria
 Archduke Josef Karl of Austria
 Duarte Nuno, Duke of Braganza
 Duarte Pio, Duke of Braganza
 Henrique de Bragança
 Prince Charles-Emmanuel de Bourbon-Parme 
 Simeon Saxe-Coburg-Gotha, former king of Bulgaria
 Paul of Greece
 King Constantine II of Greece
 Alexander, Crown Prince of Yugoslavia
 Andrew Bertie
 Giacomo dalla Torre del Tempio di Sanguinetto
 Giacomo Biffi
 Vicente de Cadenas y Vicent
 Carlo Caffarra
 Carl, Duke of Württemberg
 Prince Franz Wilhelm of Prussia
 Friedrich Wilhelm, Prince of Hohenzollern
 Prince Johann Georg of Hohenzollern
 Cardinal Józef Glemp
 Infante Jaime, Duke of Segovia
 Andrzej Ciechanowiecki
 Cardinal Pietro Palazzini
 Cardinal Andrea Cordero Lanza di Montezemolo
 Cardinal Gerhard Ludwig Müller
 Cardinal Giovanni Battista Re
 Cardinal Gianfranco Ravasi
 Cardinal Carlos Osoro Sierra
 Cardinal Antonio Cañizares Llovera
 Cardinal Jean-Claude Hollerich
 Cardinal Dominique Mamberti
 Cardinal Dominik Duka
 Cardinal Eduardo Martínez Somalo
 Cardinal Antonio María Rouco Varela
 Cardinal Carlos Amigo Vallejo
 Cardinal James Michael Harvey
 Cardinal Willem Jacobus Eijk
 Cardinal George Pell
 Cardinal Darío Castrillón Hoyos
 Cardinal Gilberto Agustoni
 Cardinal Fernando Cento
 Cardinal Giovanni Cheli
 Cardinal Anthony Bevilacqua
 Cardinal  Zenon Grocholewski
 Cardinal Antonio Innocenti
 Cardinal Arcadio Larraona Saralegui
 Prince Gabriel of Bourbon-Two Sicilies
 Prince Georg of Bavaria
 Otto von Habsburg
 Isabella II of Spain
 List of titles and honours of Juan Carlos I of Spain
 Eduard, Prince of Anhalt
 Alfonso, Duke of Anjou and Cádiz
 Letsie III
 Antonio Mennini
 J. Michael Miller
 Gabriel Montalvo Higuera
 Carlos Fitz-James Stuart, 19th Duke of Alba
 Guy Stair Sainty
 Prince Rupert Loewenstein
 Vincent Nichols
 George Stack
Dames Grand Crosses of Justice
 Infanta Alicia, Duchess of Calabria
 Princess Anne, Duchess of Calabria
 Princess Beatrice of Saxe-Coburg and Gotha
 Cayetana Fitz-James Stuart, 18th Duchess of Alba
 Frederica of Hanover
 Princess Irene of Greece and Denmark
 Princess Isabel Alfonsa of Bourbon-Two Sicilies
 Cécile La Grenade
 Leonida Bagration of Mukhrani
 Infanta Margarita, Duchess of Soria
 Princess Marie des Neiges of Bourbon-Parma
 Princess María de los Dolores of Bourbon-Two Sicilies
 Princess María de la Esperanza of Bourbon-Two Sicilies
 Princess Maria di Grazia of Bourbon-Two Sicilies
 Princess Maria Ludwiga Theresia of Bavaria
 Princess María de las Mercedes of Bourbon-Two Sicilies
 Princess Michael of Kent
 List of titles and honours of Queen Sofía of Spain
 Princess Urraca of Bourbon-Two Sicilies
 Victoria Eugenie of Battenberg
Other or Unknown Classes of Dames
 Princess Maria Adelaide of Savoy-Genoa
 Cécile La Grenade
 Leonida Bagration of Mukhrani
 Marta Linares de Martinelli
 Georgina Fitzalan-Howard, Duchess of Norfolk
 María Clemencia Rodríguez Múnera
 Barbara Tuge-Erecińska
Knights Grand Crosses of Justice
 Prince Adalbert of Bavaria (1886–1970)
 Afonso, Prince of Beira
 Emanuele Filiberto of Savoy, Prince of Venice
 Albert, 12th Prince of Thurn and Taxis
 Archduke Albrecht, Duke of Teschen
 Alexander II of Russia
 Infante Alfonso, Duke of Galliera
 Alfred I, Prince of Windisch-Grätz
 Princess Béatrice of Bourbon-Two Sicilies
 Boris III of Bulgaria
 Agostino Borromeo
 Desmond Connell
 Timothy M. Dolan
 Ernest Louis, Grand Duke of Hesse
 Prince Eugenio, Duke of Genoa
 Ferdinand I of Bulgaria
 Prince Ferdinand, Duke of Castro
 Matthew Festing
 Franz Joseph I of Austria
 Archduke Franz Karl of Austria
 Archduke Friedrich, Duke of Teschen
 Georg, Duke of Hohenberg
 Carlos Gereda y de Borbón
 Jean, Count of Paris
 List of titles and honours of Juan Carlos I of Spain
 Prince Laurent of Belgium
 Leopold II, Grand Duke of Tuscany
 Leopold, Prince of Salerno
 Prince Louis, Count of Trani
 Princess Maria Antonia of the Two Sicilies
 Maria Theresa of Austria (1816–1867)
 Edoardo Menichelli
 Klemens von Metternich
 Cormac Murphy-O'Connor
 Mario Nasalli Rocca di Corneliano
 Christopher de Paus
 Pedro II of Brazil
 Pedro Carlos of Orléans-Braganza
 Prince Pedro Gastão of Orléans-Braganza
 Géraud Michel de Pierredon
 Infanta Pilar, Duchess of Badajoz
 Giuseppe Pizzardo
 Luigi Poggi
 Ugo Poletti
 Norberto Rivera Carrera
 Archduke Rudolf of Austria (1919–2010)
 Rudolf, Crown Prince of Austria
 Carlo Emanuele Ruspoli, 3rd Duke of Morignano
 John de Salis, 9th Count de Salis-Soglio
 Prince Seeiso of Lesotho
 Archduke Stephen of Austria (Palatine of Hungary)
 Conrad Swan
 Luigi Traglia
 Augusto Vargas Alzamora
 Vittorio Emanuele, Prince of Naples
 Grand Duke Vladimir Kirillovich of Russia
 William Albert, 1st Prince of Montenuovo
 Thomas Winning
Knights Commanders of Justice
 Charles Guthrie, Baron Guthrie of Craigiebank
Knights Grand Crosses of Merit
 Carlos Abascal
 Bertie Ahern
 Anthony Bailey (PR advisor)
 John Bruton
 Charlotte, Grand Duchess of Luxembourg
 Salvatore Cuffaro
 Erich Feigl
 Arnaldo Forlani
 Giustino Fortunato (1777–1862)
 Elmar Mäder
 Joaquín Navarro-Valls
 Abel Pacheco
 Gianfranco Ravasi
 Fernando Arêas Rifan
 Marcelo Sánchez Sorondo
 José Sarney
 Charles Savarin
 Giovanni Tonucci
Knights Commanders or Knights of Merit
 Gabriele Albertini
 David Alton
 Heinrich VII, Prince Reuss of Köstritz
 Gino Lupini
 Paul Murphy, Baron Murphy of Torfaen
 Enrico Salati
Other or Unknown Classes of Knights
 Mark Watson-Gandy
 János Áder
 Afonso, Prince of Beira
 Giulio Andreotti
 Bernard Barsi
 Matthäus Casimir von Collin
 John D. Faris
 Jean, Count of Paris
 Prince Laurent of Belgium
 Nicholas Liverpool
 Princess Maria Antonia of the Two Sicilies
 Maria Theresa of Austria (1816–1867)
 Ricardo Martinelli
 Mary McAleese
 Vincent McBrierty
 Mireya Moscoso
 Napoleon II
 Abel Pacheco
 Nicolae Petrescu-Comnen
 Giuseppe Resnati
 Juan Manuel Santos
Grand Priors
 Cardinal Gerhard Ludwig Müller
 Cardinal Darío Castrillón Hoyos
 Cardinal Antonio Innocenti
 Domenico Pignatelli di Belmonte
 Renato Martino
 Mario Francesco Pompedda
 Albert Vanhoye

See also

Order of Saint Januarius
Order of Saint Ferdinand and of Merit
Order of Saint George and Reunion
Royal Order of Francis I

References

Bibliography

External links

Hispano-Neapolitan branch website (Grand Master: Prince Pedro, Duke of Calabria)
 Franco-Neapolitan branch website (Grand Master: Prince Carlo, Duke of Castro)
 Sacred Angelic Imperial Constantinian Order of Saint George (Grand Master: Prince Carlos, Duke of Parma)
 Bourbon-Parma branch's history of the order (PDF file in Italian)

House of Bourbon-Two Sicilies
Orders, decorations, and medals of the Kingdom of the Two Sicilies
Catholic orders of chivalry
1540s establishments in Italy